Oliver Hampton Smith (October 23, 1794March 19, 1859) was a United States representative and Senator from Indiana. Born on Smith's Island, near Trenton, New Jersey, (is also believed to have been born at the Smith Family Farmstead in Upper Makefield Township, Bucks County, Pennsylvania) he attended the common schools and moved west, eventually settling in Lawrenceburg, Indiana in 1818. He studied law and was admitted to the bar in 1820, commencing practice in Connersville. From 1822 to 1824 he was a member of the Indiana House of Representatives and was prosecuting attorney for the third judicial district, 1824–1825.

Smith was elected to the Twentieth Congress (March 4, 1827–March 3, 1829) and was an unsuccessful candidate for reelection in 1828; he was then elected as a Whig to the U.S. Senate and served from March 4, 1837, to March 3, 1843. While in the Senate, he was chairman of the Committee on Engrossed Bills (Twenty-sixth Congress) and a member of the Committee on Public Lands (Twenty-seventh Congress). He was an unsuccessful candidate for reelection and moved to Indianapolis where he resumed the practice of law. He declined to be a candidate for Governor of Indiana in 1845 and engaged in the railroad business in Indianapolis. He died in that city in 1859; interment was in Crown Hill Cemetery.

References

External links

 

1794 births
Politicians from Trenton, New Jersey
Members of the Indiana House of Representatives
United States senators from Indiana
Burials at Crown Hill Cemetery
1859 deaths
Indiana Whigs
Indiana Democratic-Republicans
Whig Party United States senators
Jacksonian members of the United States House of Representatives from Indiana
19th-century American politicians
People from Lawrenceburg, Indiana
People from Bucks County, Pennsylvania
People from Connersville, Indiana